A wight is a sentient creature or being, in modern fantasy works especially an undead or wraith-like creature.

Wight may also refer to:

Arts, entertainment, and media
 Wight (Dungeons & Dragons), a fictional monster in Dungeons & Dragons
 Wights, characters in A Song of Ice and Fire
Wights, characters in Game of Thrones
 Barrow-wight, a fictitious creature

Business and organisations
 J. Samuel White, a British shipbuilding firm; its former aviation department (1912–1916) was called Wight Aircraft
 Wight and Wight, a former architecture firm in Kansas City, Missouri, United States

People
 Wight (surname), a family name

Places
 Isle of Wight, an island off the southern coast of England
 Wight, a sea area around the island
 Wight, Texas, United States
 Wight Bank, a small submerged atoll in the Indian Ocean
 Wight Inlet, Nunavut, Canada

See also
 Isle of Wight (disambiguation)
 White (disambiguation)
 Whyte (disambiguation)